The 2010–11 Powerade Tigers season was the ninth season of the franchise in the Philippine Basketball Association (PBA).

Key dates
August 29: The 2010 PBA Draft took place in Fort Bonifacio, Taguig.

Draft picks

Roster

Depth chart

Philippine Cup

Eliminations

Standings

Game log

|- bgcolor="#bbffbb"
| 1
| October 6
| Rain or Shine
| 111–103
| David (25)
| Anthony (12)
| David, Anthony (4)
| Araneta Coliseum
| 1–0
|- bgcolor="#edbebf"
| 2
| October 9
| Ginebra
| 75–82
| David (27)
| R. Reyes (9)
| David (5)
| Batangas City
| 1–1
|- bgcolor=
| 3
| October 17
| Barako
| 
| 
| 
| 
| Araneta Coliseum
| 
|- bgcolor=
| 4
| October 23
| San Miguel
| 
| 
| 
| 
| Panabo City
| 
|- bgcolor=
| 5
| October 27
| Talk 'N Text
| 
| 
| 
| 
| Araneta Coliseum
| 
|- bgcolor=
| 6
| October 30
| Meralco
| 
| 
| 
| 
| Araneta Coliseum
| 

|- bgcolor=
| 7
| November 3
| Air21
| 
| 
| 
| 
| Araneta Coliseum
| 
|- bgcolor=
| 8
| November 10
| Alaska
| 
| 
| 
| 
| Araneta Coliseum
| 
|- bgcolor=
| 9
| November 12
| Derby Ace
| 
| 
| 
| 
| Araneta Coliseum
| 
|- bgcolor=
| 10
| November 19
| Air21
| 
| 
| 
| 
| Cuneta Astrodome
| 
|- bgcolor=
| 11
| November 24
| Meralco
| 
| 
| 
| 
| Araneta Coliseum
| 

|- bgcolor=
| 12
| December 1
| Talk 'N Text
| 
| 
| 
| 
| Araneta Coliseum
| 
|- bgcolor=
| 13
| December 3
| Ginebra
| 
| 
| 
| 
| Cuneta Astrodome
| 
|- bgcolor=
| 14
| December 15
| Alaska
| 
| 
| 
| 
| Araneta Coliseum
|

Commissioner's Cup

Eliminations

Standings

Governors Cup

Eliminations

Standings

Transactions

Pre-season

Philippine Cup

Trades

Imports recruited

References

Powerade Tigers seasons
Powerade